Zovaber may refer to:

 Zovaber, Gegharkunik, Armenia
 Zovaber, Syunik, Armenia